The list of ship commissionings in 1865 includes a chronological list of all ships commissioned in 1865.


References

See also 

1865
 Ship commissionings